Kelly Sueda (born 1972) is a painter who was born and raised in Hawaii.  He received a BFA from the Academy of Art College in San Francisco and the University of San Francisco.  He has shown his paintings in both solo and group shows in Hawaii and on the mainland.  Kelly Sueda lives and works in Hawaii, and his work is in the collection of the Honolulu Museum of Art.

References
 International Art Society of Hawai'i, Kuilima Kākou, Hawai’i-Japan Joint Exhibition, Honolulu, International Art Society of Hawai'i, 2004, p. 43
 Morse, Marcia and Allison Wong, 10 Years: The Contemporary Museum at First Hawaiian Center, The Contemporary Museum, Honolulu, 2006, p. 110
 Rich, Jessica Lani, The Gift of Hawaii, illustrated by Kelly Sueda, Honolulu, Hawaii, Watermark Publishing, 2002.
 Sueda, Kelly, Aloha Shirt Colors, Honolulu, Hawaii, BeachHouse Pub., 2006.

External links
Listing with illustrations at Cedar Street Gallery

1972 births
Academy of Art University alumni
Living people
20th-century American painters
American male painters
21st-century American painters
Artists from Hawaii
University of San Francisco alumni
American artists of Japanese descent
20th-century American male artists